Lanesville is an unincorporated community in King William County, Virginia, United States.

Notable people
 
 
Samuel Osborne (1833–1903) an African American custodian and caretaker for 37 years at Colby College

References

Unincorporated communities in Virginia
Unincorporated communities in King William County, Virginia